Nardoa is a genus of sea stars in the family Ophidiasteridae.

Species

Species include:

Nardoa frianti 
Nardoa galatheae 
Nardoa gomophia 
Nardoa mamillifera 
Nardoa novaecaledoniae 
Nardoa rosea 
Nardoa tuberculata 
Nardoa tumulosa 
Nardoa variolata

References

Asteroidea genera
Ophidiasteridae